François Calmels (born 11 December 1981) is a French professional golfer who currently plays on the European Tour.

Career
Calmels was born in Paris. He was a distinguished amateur, winning the 2004 Coupe Mouchy (highest amateur competition in France), and the 2006 Portuguese Amateur Open Championship. He turned professional in 2006 and won twice during his first season on the Alps Tour, one of Europe's third tier developmental professional golf tours. He won for the first time on the second-tier European Challenge Tour in May 2009, when he claimed the Telenet Trophy by one stroke over Spaniard Carlos Rodiles - one week after watching his girlfriend, Jade Schaeffer make her Ladies European Tour breakthrough at the Hypo Vereinsbank Ladies German Open, he followed her into the winner's enclosure by birdieing the last two holes at Royal Waterloo Golf Club to win by one stroke.

In 2007 and 2010, Calmels played on both the European Tour and the Challenge Tour. His best finish on the European Tour was a tie for second at the 2007 Open de Saint-Omer, a tournament co-sanctioned by both tours. In November 2011 he was hurted in a lift accident and spent months recovering. He came back on Challenge Tour after Q school. In 2013 he was on Challenge Tour and finished the season 11th in ranking. He is back on European Tour for the 2014 season

Personal life
Calmels has long been a friend of European Tour champion golfer and fellow Frenchman Grégory Havret.

Calmels turned seriously to golf at the age of eleven, he underwent several operations on his mouth after birth double cleft and was advised by doctors to take up a non-contact sport after being struck in the face playing handball – the game his father played in the French First Division – so he decided to concentrate on golf.

Amateur wins
2004 Coupe Mouchy
2006 Portuguese Amateur Open Championship

Professional wins (7)

Challenge Tour wins (3)

Alps Tour wins (2)

French Tour wins (2)

Team appearances
Amateur
European Amateur Team Championship (representing France): 2005

See also
2006 European Tour Qualifying School graduates
2009 Challenge Tour graduates
2013 Challenge Tour graduates

External links

French male golfers
European Tour golfers
Golfers from Paris
1981 births
Living people
21st-century French people